William Gustavo Constâncio (born 9 January 1992), simply known as Gustavo, is a Brazilian professional footballer who plays as a centre-back, most recently for Yerevan.

Career
Born in Limeira, Brazil, Gustavo signed for Académica, on 11 July 2015, on a two-year loan.

On 25 June 2019, Lori FC announced the signing of Gustavo on a two-year contract. On 4 September 2019, FC Yerevan announced the signing of Gustavo on a one-year contract. On 21 February 2020, the Football Federation of Armenia announced that FC Yerevan had withdrawn from the league due to financial and technical problems.

References

External links

1992 births
Living people
Brazilian footballers
Association football defenders
Primeira Liga players
Associação Académica de Coimbra – O.A.F. players
A.R.C. Oleiros players
Brazilian expatriate footballers
Expatriate footballers in Portugal
Brazilian expatriate sportspeople in Portugal
Expatriate footballers in Estonia
Brazilian expatriate sportspeople in Estonia
Expatriate footballers in Armenia
Brazilian expatriate sportspeople in Armenia
Meistriliiga players
Nõmme Kalju FC players
FC Lori players
FC Yerevan players